Historia Calamitatum (known in English as The Story of My Misfortunes or The History of My Calamities), also known as Abaelardi ad Amicum Suum Consolatoria, is an autobiographical work in Latin by Peter Abelard (1079–1142), a medieval French pioneer of scholastic philosophy. The work, written in 1132 or soon after, is one of the first autobiographical works in medieval Western Europe, written in the form of a letter (and, as such, is clearly influenced by Augustine's Confessions).

The  letter is an extensive and honest self-analysis of Abelard up to the age of about fifty-four, and provides readers with knowledge of his views of women, learning, monastic life, Church and State combined, and the social milieu of the time. It should be particularly noted that the work was written at a time when Western Europe had only recently surfaced into the world of philosophy.

Abelard emphasizes how persecuted he feels by his peers throughout the work. He quotes saints, apostles, and at one point, compares his struggles in likeness to those of Christ.

Editions
 The Letters of Abelard and Heloise, trans. Betty Radice (Penguin, 1974) [contains translation of the Historia Calamitatum on pp. 57–106]

References

External links
 English translation of Historia Calamitatum by Henry Adams Bellows on the Internet Medieval Sourcebook
 
 Latin text of Historia Calamitatum from the Latin Library

Medieval literature
Autobiographies
12th-century Latin books